The coat of arms of the Central African Republic consists of a shield in the center, with two flags on its edges, and with a sun rising over the shield. Below and above the shield are banners, and there is the badge of the Order of Central African Merit located below the shield as well.

Symbolism
ZO KWE ZO, the motto in Sango, means "A man is a man" or "All people are people".

The elephant and the baobab tree represent nature and the backbone of the country. The gold star on a map of Africa symbolizes the position of the Central African Republic. The hand (bottom right quarter) was the symbol of the dominant MESAN party in 1963 when the arms were adopted.
The bottom left quarter holds three diamonds, which symbolize the mineral resources of the country.

The medal under the shield is the honorific decoration of the Order of Central African Merit.

An earlier version of the coat of arms had the words "1er DECEMBRE 1958" written within the sun.

Former coats of arms

See also
Coat of arms of the Central African Empire

References

External links 
 National Arms and Emblems Past and Present – Central African Republic

National symbols of the Central African Republic
Central African Republic
Central African Republic
Central African Republic
Central African Republic
Central African Republic
Central African Republic
Central African Republic
Central African Republic